Richard Gardner may refer to:

Richard Gardner (politician) (1812–1856), British Member of Parliament for Leicester
Richard Nelson Gardner (1881–1953), American lawyer and politician
Richard N. Gardner (1927–2019), American ambassador to Italy and Spain
Richard A. Gardner (1931–2003), American psychiatrist
Richard Gardner (sport shooter) (born 1938), Zimbabwean sports shooter
Sir Richard Gardner (embryologist) (born 1943), British embryologist and geneticist
Ritchie Gardner (born 1958), English professional darts player
Rich Gardner (born 1981), American football player

See also
Richard Gardiner (disambiguation)